Storehouse plc, traded as Storehouse, was a large UK retail business formed by Terence Conran through the merger of various high street chains. It was listed on the London Stock Exchange and was once a constituent of the FTSE 100 Index before it was renamed Mothercare in 2000.

History
The company was formed in 1986 by the merger of Habitat Mothercare PLC with British Home Stores PLC. The shareholders of BHS held 55% of the resulting company with Habitat Mothercare the remaining 45%. The resulting chain comprised British Home Stores (including their 50% stake in SavaCentre), Habitat, Conran's, Conran Design Group, Conran Studios, Mothercare (including Habitat Mothercare's 20% stake in Fnac and 50% stake in Conran Octopus Publishing), Richard Shops, NOW, Heal's, and The Conran Shop.

1987 saw the group start to expand with the establishment of the Anonymous retail chain, the launch of the firm's in-house credit card ; Storecard (in association with Citibank). Speculation in the City that Storehouse was worth less as a whole than the sum of its parts began to circulate during 1987 which culminated in an offer by the property company Mountleigh in September 1987 which valued the company at £1.8 billion, this was dismissed and quickly followed a bid from a small engineering firm valued at £45 million; Benlox Holdings plc, which was used as a vehicle by financier Peter Earl, valuing Storehouse at £2.007 billion. This too was rejected.

In 1988 Storehouse appointed a new chief executive; Michael Julien (former Managing Director (Finance and Administration) of Guinness plc), to replace Terence Conran who remained as chairman until 1990, and the group was reorganised into three divisions, British Home Stores, 'Speciality Retailing' comprising the group's brands Mothercare, Richard Shops, Blazer, Anonymous and Jacadi and 'Home Furnishing' comprising Habitat, Heals, and The Conran Shop. Julien retired on health grounds in 1992 and was replaced by David Dworkin the Chief Executive of British Home Stores.

In 1992 Habitat was purchased from Storehouse by IKANO and Richard Shops was sold to the British retailing giant Sears plc.

The Company bought Children's World from Boots in 1996, and rebranded all of their superstores Mothercare World stores.

In 2000, following several years of tough trading for all companies within the group, British Home Stores was sold to Philip Green for £200m cash. Storehouse then changed its name to Mothercare plc.

References

External links
Bhs Home
Mothercare Home
Mothercare Plc Investor Home
Habitat Home
 Storehouse – article from Funding Universe
 Storehouse – article in New York Times

Companies based in the City of London
Companies formerly listed on the London Stock Exchange
Defunct retail companies of the United Kingdom
Retail companies established in 1986
Retail companies disestablished in 2000
1986 establishments in England